Lashtaghan-e Pain va Bala (also Romanized as Lashtaghān-e Pā’īn va Bālā; also known as Lashtaghān-e Pā’īn, Lashteqān-e Pā’īn, and Lashteqān Pā‘īn) is a village in Khamir Rural District, in the Central District of Khamir County, Hormozgan Province, Iran. At the 2006 census, its population was 2,745, in 532 families.

References 

Populated places in Khamir County